Kaliese Spencer Carter  (born 6 May 1987) is a Jamaican track and field athlete who specialises in the 400 metres hurdles. She won the bronze medal in the event at the 2012 London Olympics. Spencer was the Commonwealth Games champion in 2014 and a double silver medallist at the 2014 World Indoor Championships. She finished fourth at both the 2009 and 2011 World Championships in Athletics.

Spencer was the 2006 World junior champion. She is a four-time Diamond League 400 m hurdles winner.

Career
Born in the parish of Westmoreland, Jamaica, her mother, Merfelin Spencer was a 400 m runner in college and her father Joshua Spencer was a middle-distance runner and she followed in their footsteps into the sport of athletics. She attended the University of Technology in Jamaica and began focusing on her running under the tutelage of Stephen Francis as part of his Maximising Velocity and Power Track Club. She had her first hurdles success at the 2006 World Junior Championships in Athletics, where she won the junior 400 m hurdles title with a personal best run of 55.11 seconds. Her debut at the senior level came the following year and she reached the semi-finals of her event at the 2007 World Championships in Athletics in Osaka.

Spencer made a strong start to the 2008 outdoor season by running a world-leading time in the 400 metres at the Azuza Pacific Invitational, winning in a personal best time of 50.55 seconds. However, she suffered a hip injury and only trained sporadically in the rest of the year, missing out on the Jamaican Olympic team for the 2008 Beijing Games as a result.

She began competing in the IAAF Golden League in 2009, performing at the Reebok Grand Prix, Golden Gala and Herculis meetings, although she failed to reach the podium on those occasions. At the 2009 World Championships, Spencer reached the final of the women's 400 m hurdles and finished fourth with a personal best run of 53.56 seconds – her club teammate Melaine Walker won the gold in a championship record. She was also the substitute runner in the 4 × 400 m relay at the championships and helped her team progress to the final where they won the silver medal. She took a victory over Walker shortly afterwards at the IAAF Zagreb Grand Prix. Spencer ended her season by winning the silver medal at the 2009 IAAF World Athletics Final, running 53.99 seconds to finish behind Walker.

The 2010 IAAF Diamond League became Spencer's principal target the following year and she was sixth at first meeting, the Shanghai Golden Grand Prix in May. She won at the Meeting International Mohammed VI d'Athlétisme de Rabat, defeating Perri Shakes-Drayton, and was third in the 400 m at the Jamaican Championships that month. She began making an impact on the Diamond League, finishing as runner-up behind Lashinda Demus at the Prefontaine Classic and the Golden Gala, recording a personal best 53.48 s. She had her first win on the major circuit at the British Grand Prix. She won at the Herculis meeting soon after and also set a meet record of 53.72 s at the Spitzenleichtathletik competition in Switzerland.

The 24-year-old set a personal best in the 400 m hurdles of 52.79 s at the Aviva Grand Prix in Crystal Palace on 5 August 2011. As a result, Spencer was heavy favourite to win the gold medal at 2011 World Championships in Athletics in Daegu, South Korea, where she finished fourth.

At the 2012 London Olympics, Spencer initially narrowly missed out on a medal, finishing in fourth place in the 400 m hurdles. She was upgraded to the bronze medal in December 2022, following the stripping of gold medallist Natalya Antyukh of Russia.

Spencer won the gold medal in her specialist event at the 2014 Commonwealth Games held in Glasgow.

Achievements

All information taken from World Athletics profile.

Personal bests

International competitions

1Time from the heats; Spencer was replaced in the final.

Circuit wins and titles
 Diamond League overall winner 400 m hurdles (4):  2010,  2011,  2012,  2014
 400 metres hurdles wins, other events specified in parenthesis
 2010 (4): Gateshead British Grand Prix, Monaco Herculis, London Grand Prix, Zürich Weltklasse
 2011 (4): Shanghai Golden Grand Prix, Stockholm DN Galan, London (WL MR), Zürich
 2012 (4): Rome Golden Gala, Lausanne Athletissima (SB), Birmingham British Grand Prix (MR), Brussels Memorial Van Damme
 2014 (6): Eugene Prefontaine Classic (WL), Rome (WL), Oslo Bislett Games, Monaco, Birmingham, Brussels
 2015 (3): Shanghai (WL), Birmingham (SB), Oslo (WL)

National titles
 Jamaican Athletics Championships
 400 m hurdles: 2011, 2014

References

External links

Audio interview in 2009

1987 births
Living people
People from Westmoreland Parish
Jamaican female hurdlers
Olympic athletes of Jamaica
Athletes (track and field) at the 2012 Summer Olympics
Athletes (track and field) at the 2016 Summer Olympics
Commonwealth Games gold medallists for Jamaica
Commonwealth Games medallists in athletics
Athletes (track and field) at the 2014 Commonwealth Games
World Athletics Championships athletes for Jamaica
World Athletics Championships medalists
Diamond League winners
World Athletics Indoor Championships medalists
IAAF Continental Cup winners
Medallists at the 2014 Commonwealth Games